Ushkovo is a municipal settlement in Kurortny District of the federal city of St. Petersburg, Russia, located on the Karelian Isthmus, on the northern shore of the Gulf of Finland. Population:   

Before the Winter and the Continuation Wars, it was a part of Finland's municipality of Terijoki (modern Zelenogorsk).

References

Municipal settlements under jurisdiction of Saint Petersburg
Kurortny District
Karelian Isthmus